Simone Cavens, also known as Cupie Cavens, was an American silent film actress who appeared in three films, The Unseen Vengeance (1915), Mother's Busy Week (1915), and Dad's College Widow (1916)

External links

American silent film actresses
1887 births
Place of birth missing
Year of death missing
Place of death missing
20th-century American actresses
Belgian emigrants to the United States